The 1931 Richmond Spiders football team was an American football team that represented the University of Richmond as a member of the Virginia Conference during the 1931 college football season. In their 18th season under head coach Frank Dobson, Richmond compiled a 4–5 record.

Schedule

References

Richmond
Richmond Spiders football seasons
Richmond Spiders football